Marko van Basten Çema (born 16 January 1998), commonly known as Marko Çema is an Cham Albanian professional footballer who plays as a forward for Albanian club Partizani Tirana B and the Chameria national team.

Club career

Kukësi
On 15 June 2019, Çema signed a two-year contract with Kategoria Superiore club Kukësi. On 1 October 2019, he made his debut in the 2019–20 Albanian Cup first round against Shkumbini after being named in the starting line-up and scored his side's hattrick during a 6–0 home win.

Erzeni
On 23 August 2020, Çema signed a one-year contract with Kategoria e Parë club Erzeni. On 4 November 2020, he made his debut in a 0–2 home defeat against former club Dinamo Tirana after being named in the starting line-up.

Partizani Tirana B
On 1 February 2021, Çema joined Kategoria e Parë side Partizani Tirana B. Nineteen days later, he made his debut in a 0–0 away draw against Besëlidhja Lezhë after coming on as a substitute at 83rd minute in place of Odeon Bërdufi.

International career
Born in the Albania, Çema is of Cham Albanian descent, he represented Albania U19 at both the 2016 and 2017 editions of the UEFA European Under-19 Championship qualifications. In May 2019, Çema was named as part of the Chameria squad for 2019 CONIFA European Football Cup. On 3 June 2019, he made his debut with Chameria in 2019 CONIFA European Football Cup group stage match against Artsakh and scored his side's two goals during a 4–1 home win.

Career statistics

Club

References

External links

1998 births
Living people
Footballers from Tirana
Albanian footballers
Albania youth international footballers
Cham Albanians
Association football forwards
Kategoria e Tretë players
Kategoria e Dytë players
Kategoria e Parë players
FK Dinamo Tirana players
KF Erzeni players
Kategoria Superiore players
FK Kukësi players